Muʾmin or mumin (feminine  ) is an Arabic and Islamic term, frequently referenced in the Quran, meaning "believer". It denotes a person who has complete submission to the will of God and has faith firmly established in his heart, i.e. a "faithful Muslim". Also, it is used as a name and one of the names of God in Islam. The opposite term of īmān (faith) is kufr (unbelief), and the opposite of muʾmin is kāfir (unbeliever).

In the Quran 
The Quran states:
(An-Nisa ) O you who believe! Believe in Allah, and His Messenger (Muhammad), and the Book (the Quran) which He has sent down to His Messenger, and the Scripture which He sent down to those before (him), and whosoever disbelieves in Allah, His Angels, His Books, His Messengers, and the Last Day, then indeed he has strayed far away.
This verse addresses the believers, exhorting them to believe, implying multiple stages of belief.

Difference between Muslim and Muʾmin 
The term Muʾmin is the preferred term used in the Qur'an to describe monotheistic believers.

But the following verse makes a distinction between a Muslim and a believer:
(Al-Hujurat ) The Arabs of the desert say, "We believe." (tu/minoo) Say thou: Ye believe not; but rather say, "We profess Islam;" (aslamna) for the faith (al-imanu) hath not yet found its way into your hearts. But if ye obey God and His Apostle, He will not allow you to lose any of your actions, for God is Forgiving, Merciful.

Memon people 
In South Asia, the Muslim converts from Lohana tribe adopted the name Muʾmin pronounced as Memon (or Momin) as their community name. The Memon people, a collection of ethnic groups from the north western part of the South Asia are located in Sindh province in Pakistan and neighboring Gujarat state in India.

See also
 Iman (Islam)
 Kafir
 Al-Mu’minoon
 Muhammad's wives
 Amir al-Mu'minin
 Memon people
 Memons from Kathiawar
 Sindhi Memons
 Kutchi Memons
 Okhai Memons

References

External links 
 http://quran.com/23 Surat ul Mu'minoon

Arabic words and phrases
Islamic belief and doctrine
Islamic honorifics
Islamic terminology
Names of God in Islam